Viktor Viktorovich Yablonskyi (born 6 January 1970 in Kiev) is a Ukrainian football coach and a former player.

Honours
Chornomorets Odesa
Ukrainian Cup winner: 1992, 1993–94
Ukrainian Premier League runner-up: 1994–95
Ukrainian Premier League bronze: 1992–93, 1993–94

References

External links
 
 

1970 births
Footballers from Kyiv
Living people
Soviet footballers
SKA Kiev players
FC Metalist Kharkiv players
Ukrainian footballers
FC Chornomorets Odesa players
FC Chornomorets-2 Odesa players
Soviet Top League players
Soviet Second League players
Soviet Second League B players
Ukrainian Premier League players
Ukrainian First League players
Ukrainian Second League players
SC Odesa players
FC Baltika Kaliningrad players
Ukrainian expatriate footballers
Expatriate footballers in Russia
Ukrainian expatriate sportspeople in Russia
Russian Premier League players
FC Metallurg Lipetsk players
FC Arsenal Tula players
FC Vityaz Podolsk players
Ukrainian football managers
Ukrainian expatriate football managers
Expatriate football managers in Russia

Association football midfielders